St. Amant  (or Saint Amant) is an unincorporated community located in Ascension Parish, in the U.S. state of Louisiana.  This community has not been incorporated into a city or town. It is situated about 25 miles south-east of Baton Rouge. and 50 miles north west of New Orleans.  It is named after the St. Amant family, some of the early settlers in the region.  The Saint Amant post office has the ZIP code of 70774.

Geography 
St. Amant is located near the largest city in Ascension Parish, Gonzales, which is three miles to the north-west.

Education 
The following schools are located within the community:

St. Amant High School
St. Amant Middle School
St. Amant Primary School
Lake Elementary School

The high school is located on Highway 431.  St. Amant middle school, primary school and the post office are located on Highway 429.
Lake Elementary School is located on Highway 431.

Notable people 
 Reid Brignac, baseball shortstop
 Ben Sheets, MLB All-Star pitcher
John "Hot Rod" Williams, NBA basketball player

Notable events 
St. Amant became the subject of national headlines after the 2016 Louisiana Floods, due to the devastation in the area. The area was visited by then-presidential candidate, Donald J. Trump.

References

Unincorporated communities in Ascension Parish, Louisiana
Unincorporated communities in Louisiana
Baton Rouge metropolitan area